Cyema atrum is a species of deep-water bobtail snipe eel in the family Cyematidae. It is the only member of its genus Cyema. Common names include the bobtail eel, snipe eel, scissorjaw eel, and arrow eel. There is not much information about this enigmatic fish, because it is so rare and has been encountered a small number of times, but its diet may be composed of tiny fish larvae, zooplankton, copepods, amphipods, sea snow, and tiny krill. Instead of gobbling them up, the eel uses the comb-like teeth to swipe the food from the water column by slashing the head to the sides.

Description 
This eel has a somewhat strange shaped tail, which gives it some of its names. They have diminutive pectoral fins, long jaws, very small eyes, and an overall dark coloration which probably helps it blend in the dark water where it lives, or maybe absorb the light emitted by other fishes, which is the defense method of the ridgeheads, which are not related to eels in any way. The dark coloration of the ridgeheads absorbs up to 95.5% of the light, rendering the fish basically invisible in the dark and barely visible even in lit conditions, with just a silhouette appearing in the ridgehead's place, but this has not been proved with this species. They do not perform any vertical migration at night. They have a worldwide distribution, but they are more commonly found in South Africa, Chile, Panama, the US, New Zealand, and Australia. A remarkable aspect of this small and enigmatic fish is that, as the body narrows, the spine of the eel becomes visible through its skin, giving the tail the aspect of a tree leaf. Another characteristic is that the mouth is very narrow at the end, but very wide at the base on the head, and it goes far beyond the eyes, a vague illusion of a gulper eel. The genus Cyema is monotypic, its only species being this one. There is no information about its reproduction.

References 

Cyematidae
Monotypic ray-finned fish genera
Taxa named by Albert Günther